John Coscombe or Goscombe (fl. 1401) was an English politician.

Family
Coscombe was the son of William Coscombe and his wife Margery.

Career
He was a Member (MP) of the Parliament of England for Exeter in 1401.

References

14th-century births
15th-century deaths
English MPs 1401
Members of the Parliament of England (pre-1707) for Exeter